Love Me is a studio album by American country music artist Jeanne Pruett. It was released in October 1972 on Decca Records and was produced by Walter Haynes. Love Me was the debut studio recording in Pruett's music career and the first of several albums she issued with the Decca (later renamed MCA) label. The album contained 11 tracks, four of which were released as a singles and became charting hits on the national country music charts.

Background and content
Love Me was recorded between 1971 and 1972 at Bradley's Barn, a studio located in Mount Juliet, Tennessee. The sessions were produced by Walter Haynes. The project was a collection of 11 tracks. According to Pruett, each of the songs chosen for the album were handpicked by Pruett and Haynes as a collaborative team. She also chose to dedicate the album to her agent, Hubert Long, who encouraged her music career. Four of the album's tracks were composed by Pruett herself. This included two singles that were later released. The album also included cover versions of material first cut by other country artists. Among the album's cover was Dolly Parton's "Lost Forever in Your Kiss", The Davis Sisters' "I Forgot More Than You'll Ever Know" and Donna Fargo's "The Happiest Girl in the Whole U.S.A.".

Release and reception
Love Me was released in October 1972 on Decca Records, making it Pruett's debut studio album. The project was issued as a vinyl recording, featuring six songs on "side one" and five songs on "side two" of the LP. Love Me did not reach a position on any Billboard magazine album charts following its release, including the Top Country Albums list. The magazine did however give the release a positive response in 1972. "A sterling, stirring effort for the debut of Jeanne Pruett," critics wrote. The publication also highlighted several tracks that they believed were standouts, including her cover of "I Forgot More Than You'll Ever Know".

Love Me included four singles that were released between 1971 and 1972. All the songs became charting singles on the Billboard Hot Country Singlessurvey. The first to be issued was the self-composed "Hold to My Unchanging Love" in July 1972. It became Pruett's first charting single in her career, reaching number 66 on the country chart. The title track was released in January 1972. The song reached number 34 on the Billboard country singles chart, becoming the album's only top 40 hit. "Call on Me" was issued as the third single in June 1972. Spending three weeks on the Billboard country chart, it only reached number 64 by August. "I Forgot More Than You'll Ever Know" was the fourth and final single released, which occurred in August 1972. After spending six weeks charting, it only reached number 60 on the country chart.

Track listing

Personnel
All credits are adapted from the liner notes of Love Me.

Musical personnel
 Harold Bradley – guitar
 Winnifred Breast – background vocals
 Ray Edenton – guitar
 Buddy Harman – drums
 Walter Haynes – steel guitar
 The Jordanaires – background vocals
 Millie Kirkham – background vocals
 Grady Martin – guitar
 Charlie McCoy – harmonica, vibes
 Bob Moore – bass
 LaVerna Moore – background vocals
 Jeanne Pruett – lead vocals, harmony vocals
 Hal Rugg – steel guitar
 Jerry Smith – piano
 Pete Wade – guitar
 Duane West – background vocals

Technical personnel
 Walter Haynes – producer
 Dan Quest – photography

Release history

References

1972 albums
Decca Records albums
Jeanne Pruett albums